Bosnian Wand Airlines was an airline based at Sarajevo International Airport in Bosnia and Herzegovina, that offered scheduled flights to European and Middle Eastern destinations. It was forced to suspend operations after only three weeks of service.

History
Bosnian Wand Airlines was founded on 24 June 2014 in Gornje Dubrave – Živinice with the plan to connect Bosnia and Herzegovina with important destinations in the world and to establish a functional air network in competition with B&H Airlines. In the meantime, preregistration of the company had been done the headquarter had been located to Sarajevo.

Bosnian Wand Airlines planned to obtain its own air operator's certificate, until then all flights were to be operated by Hermes Airlines. The first flight was conducted on 25 January 2015 from Sarajevo to Athens.

On 10 February 2015, the airline was ordered by the Bosnian authorities to already suspend operations again as Bosnian Wand Airlines did not hold the necessary air operator's certificate and failed to explain their affiliation with Hermes Airlines. As of 25 April 2015, the airline did not resume operations.

Destinations

From January to February 2015, Bosnian Wand Airlines offered flights to the following destinations:

Historic fleet

As Bosnian Wand Airlines did not own an operations certificate, all flights were operated by Hermes Airlines using their aircraft.

The Bosnian Wand Airlines fleet consisted of the following aircraft:

References

External links

 Official website

Defunct airlines of Bosnia and Herzegovina
Airlines established in 2014
Airlines disestablished in 2015
2014 establishments in Bosnia and Herzegovina